Eutrichites is a genus of ant-loving beetles in the family Staphylinidae. There are at least two described species in Eutrichites.

Species
These two species belong to the genus Eutrichites:
 Eutrichites arizonensis Carlton, 1989
 Eutrichites zonatus (Brendel, 1865)

References

Further reading

External links

 

Pselaphinae
Articles created by Qbugbot